The Strawberry Statement is a 1970 American drama film set in the counterculture and student revolts of the 1960s.  The story is loosely based on the non-fiction book of the same name by James Simon Kunen (who has a cameo appearance in the film) about the Columbia University protests of 1968.

Plot
The film follows the radicalization of Simon, an ordinary student at a fictional urban university in San Francisco, California, much like San Francisco State College (later San Francisco State University), which the actors refer to as "Western". Initially, Simon is indifferent to student protests going on around him.

Accidentally walking in while his roommate is having casual sex with a co-ed, Simon protests to the roommate their time should be devoted to study so they can get good jobs and earn money. Coming back clothed, the co-ed refuses setting another date with the roommate because she'll be busy protesting. She explains the university plans to construct a gymnasium in an African-American neighborhood, causing conflict with the local African American population. She describes how students plan to occupy a university building in protest.

Simon later experiences love at first sight with a co-ed (Linda) and takes advantage of his position as photographer for the college newspaper to photograph her. Following Linda into the university building as the students are taking over, he joins the protest. Linda approaches Simon as he fools around in the bathroom, then asks him to help her rob a grocery store so the strikers can eat.

In a later student protest, Simon is arrested. He confesses to Linda he is not a radical like her, and does not want to "blow up the college building" after going all-out in high school to be admitted to the college in the first place. Linda later avers she can't date someone not equally dedicated to the movement. Nevertheless, she announces temporarily leaving college to decide for sure.

In the shower, a right-wing jock (George) beats up Simon, who decides to take advantage of the situation and use his injuries from to claim police brutality. Gaining attention, a friend tells him "a white version of page 43" of Simon's National Geographic is in the next room; this turns out to be an attractive coed. Seeing his injured lip, she puts his hands on her right breast and asks if it feels better now. She then takes off her sweater, telling Simon "Did you know Lenin loved women with big breasts?" After quick flashes of her breasts, Simon confirms liking them, but asks her if she saw The Graduate. Replying no, she takes him between some filing cabinets and takes off his belt. To her surprise, Simon does not want people to see whatever it was she planned to do with him. Asking her if she would at least lock the door, she unconvincingly confirms she has and immediately opens some filing cabinets to conceal them from the crowd. Simon is worried, but she promises him no one will know. She then says she will give him something a "hero" like him deserves, ducks down and gives him an off-screen blowjob, zooming up on Che Guevara's famous poster staring in the air in its implacable expression.

After Linda returns, she announces her decision to be with Simon. They spend the rest of that day together – and, implicitly, the night. The following day, they make out in a park when a group of African-Americans approaches them. The supposedly anti-racist White rebels fear for their lives. One African-American drops Simon's camera to the ground and stomps it, but the group then leaves. A furious Simon meets the strikers, saying those they help are no different than the cops and the establishment, questioning why they should help those who disrespect and threaten him.

Simon re-thinks his comparison, after visiting George the jock, now a leftist, in the hospital, where he is in traction with his leg in a cast after right-wing jocks beat him up while cops watched. Simon goes to warn the dean's secretary to call off construction of the gymnasium or risk violence. A group of African American students then show up, proving Simon's previous generalization was wrong.

Eventually, the city police and the National Guard with bayoneted rifles arrive and crush the university building takeover using tear gas. With the strikers choking, the police and guardsmen pull haul the demonstrators from the building, beating them with batons.

With Linda being carried away kicking and screaming, Simon takes on a group of police all by himself and segments of his happier times in college flash before the viewers' eyes.

Cast

Production
Clay Felker, editor of New York magazine, showed producer Irwin Winkler a column James Kunen had written and told him it was going to be a book (it would be published in 1969). He read it and bought the film rights with partner Bob Chartoff. "We thought it could create understanding – the schism was so great between the generations then", said Winkler. "It was an important subject. These youths who are looked upon as anarchists are really just American kids reacting to problems in our society. Here was a story about an ordinary guy becoming an anarchist."

Winkler had seen The Indian Wants the Bronx and It's the Called the Sugar Plum by Israel Horovitz and asked if he had an idea how to adapt the book. Horovitz pitched the movie to MGM saying it should be shot at Columbia (University). "At the time, there was a student group that had shot a lot of black and white documentary footage of the strikes at Columbia", he said. "I wanted to intercut this documentary footage with the fiction that I planned to write. "

The pitch was successful as MGM announced they would make it in May 1969. MGM's president at the time was "Bo" Polk and the head of production was Herb Solow.

Israel Horovitz was signed to do the screenplay. He said he wrote ten drafts over two years.

François Truffaut was offered the film to direct but turned it down. The job eventually went to Stuart Hagmann who had worked in television and advertising.

Horovitz says he struggled to write the film after MGM wanted to shift it to the west coast. He talked to Kunen for a few days then asked himself, "Who is this movie for really?  What's the point of this? If it's to preach to the learned already--then it will have no worth"."

Horovitz says "I took the approach that Michael Moore must take with his documentaries.  Moore doesn't talk to the people who are already in the know--he's talking to those who don't know.  So I started to head in that direction with the re-write of the script."

Irwin Winkler later wrote in his memoirs that Hagman's directorial style, which involved "a great deal of camera movement" meant "the actors sometimes suffered from the crew's allocation of production time versus acting time. But they were game and young, though they required a lot of on-set communication."

"The scenario was cut by the director", said Horovitz, "but not by MGM. It was diluted by cutting – it should have been much stronger than it is. But then it would have lost most of its audience straight away."

Some of the film was shot in Stockton, California, other parts in San Francisco (Gorilla Records and Caffe Trieste on Grant Avenue, Alamo Square, High School of Commerce: San Francisco Unified School District Central Offices), and University of California, Berkeley and as indicated in the opening credits.

Kim Darby says the director "was very kind. He was lenient. He was a lot of fun too. He had done many commercials before, and there was the air of freedom around us."

Music
Thunderclap Newman's "Something in the Air" is featured on the soundtrack, along with 
"The Circle Game" (written by Joni Mitchell.) performed by Buffy Sainte-Marie.  "Give Peace A Chance", performed by the cast; Crosby, Stills, Nash & Young contributed "Helpless", "Our House", "The Loner" and "Down By The River".  Crosby, Stills and Nash perform "Suite: Judy Blue Eyes".

Reception
The film was a commercial and critical flop. "The critics attacked the style instead of the substance", said Winkler. "Most disappointing was the dismissal by audiences."

Vincent Canby of The New York Times wrote that the film "only lacks an occasional, superimposed written message ... to look like a giant, 103-minute commercial, not for peace, or student activism, or community responsibility, but for the director himself." Gene Siskel of the Chicago Tribune gave the film two-and-a-half stars out of four and called it "a movie with its heart, if not always its intelligence, in the right place ... The major problem with the film is that during the period before Simon James, a 20-year old student at Western Pacific university, is radicalized, neither his life style as a member of the college crew, nor the political movement on campus is very interesting. Director Stuart Hagman [sic], in his first feature effort, substitutes overly enthusiastic camera techniques and popular music played against the San Francisco scenery for a more complete character definition." Charles Champlin of the Los Angeles Times wrote, "I found 'The Strawberry Statement' inconsistent and uneven, all too glossy and yet suddenly all too real and populated with children I have no trouble recognizing as my own. And it's the true measure of the film that we are all likely to remember its best moments: The moments when we are made to see the terrible and ironic costs of innocence and idealism." Gary Arnold of The Washington Post stated that the violent climax "would be absurd even if it were well staged, because Hagmann and Horowitz haven't earned their catharsis. There is something howlingly inappropriate about a movie that turns 'angry' after an hour-and-a-half of puppy love, puppy protest and the confectionery audio-visual style pioneered by 'A Man and a Woman' and 'The Graduate.' It's difficult to forget that the script has been fundamentally negligible and incompetent." David Pirie of The Monthly Film Bulletin wrote, "The Strawberry Statement is certain to be attacked for its patchiness and for hollow commercial opportunism; but while students are being killed on university campuses in America, one can't help preferring its highly emotional, if faltering and uneven, tone to the slick reportage of a film like Medium Cool."

Horovitz says when he saw the film "I was really upset with it. I thought it was too cute and Californian  and too pretty."

Brian De Palma said "big studio revolutionary movies" like Strawberry were "such a joke. You can't stage that stuff. We've seen it all on television."

"Bad timing", said Davison. "Everyone had enough of the country tearing apart."

Horovitz now says he came to accept the film "for what it is, what it was, and what it represented in the time in which it was made. I'm glad I got to write it."

As a snapshot of its time, the film has collected many present-day fans, as David Sterritt writes for Turner Classic Movies:Leonard Quart expressed a more measured view in Cineaste, writing that while The Strawberry Statement is basically a "shallow, pop version of the Sixties", it still provides "a taste of the period's dreams and volatility." That's a reasonable take on the film, which is more accurate than it may seem at first glance, depicting an uncertain time when many aspiring rebels were motivated as much by romance and excitement as by principles and ideologies. The Strawberry Statement is a terrific time machine that's also fun to watch.

Awards
The film won the Jury Prize at the 1970 Cannes Film Festival, tying with Magasiskola.

In 1971, Bruce Davison was nominated for his performance for the Laurel Awards "Male Star of Tomorrow".

See also
 Port Huron Statement
 List of American films of 1970
 Columbia University protests of 1968
 Hippie
 Beatnik
 Counterculture of the 1960s
 Vietnam War
 Civil rights movement
 List of historic rock festivals
 Pacifism

References

External links

1970 films
1970s English-language films
Films based on non-fiction books
American coming-of-age comedy-drama films
Hippie films
Films set in San Francisco
Anti-war protests in the United States
1970s political comedy-drama films
American satirical films
Metro-Goldwyn-Mayer films
American political comedy-drama films
Films produced by Robert Chartoff
Films about activists
Films set in Columbia University
Films directed by Stuart Hagmann
1970s American films